The 1902 United States House of Representatives elections were held for the most part on November 8, 1902, with Oregon, Maine, and Vermont holding theirs early in either June or September. They occurred in the middle of President Theodore Roosevelt's first term, about a year after the assassination of President William McKinley in September 1901. Elections were held for 386 seats of the United States House of Representatives, representing 45 states, to serve in the 58th United States Congress.

Due to the increased size of the House and the reapportionment that resulted from the 1900 U.S. Census, the Republican Party and the Democratic Party both gained seats simultaneously, which has not occurred in any elections since. The Democrats increased their share of the House, but not by enough to regain control.

With a stable economy and no cornerstone issue, Democratic gains can mostly be linked to the effects of redistricting.  Many of the new seats were in areas with high numbers of immigrants (mostly Eastern and Southern European industrial workers, and Northern European farmers), with new immigrants tending to vote Democrat. The Populist Party disappeared from the House, with its supporters almost unanimously switching to the Democratic Party.

This election marked the third and most recent time in American history where the incumbent president's party gained House seats in a midterm election while still losing seats in the Senate, the first two being in 1814 and 1822.

Election summaries
29 new seats were added in reapportionment following the 1900 Census. No states lost seats, 16 had no change in apportionment, 14 gained 1 seat, 3 gained 2 seats, and 3 gained 3 seats. Two of the states that gained representation elected the new seat at-large.

The previous election had 5 Populists, but the party completely disappeared from the U.S. House in the 1902 elections.

Special elections 

|-
! 

|-
! 

|-
! 

|-
! 
| William Henry Moody
|  | Republican
| 1894
| Incumbent resigned May 1, 1902 to become U.S. Secretary of the Navy.New member elected November 4, 1902.Republican hold.
| nowrap |

|-
! 
| James Joseph Butler
|  | Democratic
| 1901
| Seat declared vacant.Incumbent  re-elected November 4, 1902 to finish his term.Special election later successfully contested by George C. R. Wagoner.
| nowrap | 

|-
! 

|-
! 

|-
! 

|-
! 

|-
! 

|-
! 

|-
! 

|}

Election dates 
All the states held their elections November 4, 1902, except for 3 states, with 8 seats among them:

 June 2: Oregon
 September 2: Vermont
 September 8: Maine

Alabama

Arizona Territory 
See Non-voting delegates, below.

Arkansas

California

|-
! 
| Samuel D. Woods
|  | Republican
| 1900
|  | Incumbent retired.New member elected.Republican hold.
| nowrap | 

|-
! 
| Frank Coombs
|  | Republican
| 1900
|  | Incumbent lost re-election.New member elected.Democratic gain.
| nowrap | 

|-
! 
| Victor H. Metcalf
|  | Republican
| 1898
| Incumbent re-elected.
| nowrap | 

|-
! 
| Julius Kahn
|  | Republican
| 1898
|  | Incumbent lost re-election.New member elected.Democratic gain.
| nowrap | 

|-
! 
| Eugene F. Loud
|  | Republican
| 1890
|  | Incumbent lost re-election.New member elected.Democratic gain.
| nowrap | 

|-
! 
| James C. Needham
|  | Republican
| 1898
| Incumbent re-elected.
| nowrap | 

|-
! 
| James McLachlan
|  | Republican
| 1900
| Incumbent re-elected.
| nowrap | 

|-
! 
| colspan=3 | None (District created)
|  | New seat.New member elected.Republican gain.
| nowrap | 

|}

Colorado

Connecticut

Delaware

Florida

|-
! 
| Stephen M. Sparkman
|  | Democratic
| 1894
| Incumbent re-elected.
| nowrap | 

|-
! 
| Robert Wyche Davis
|  | Democratic
| 1896
| Incumbent re-elected.
| nowrap | 

|-
! 
| colspan=3 | None (District created)
|  | New seat.New member elected.Democratic gain.
| nowrap | 

|}

Georgia

Hawaii Territory 
See Non-voting delegates, below.

Idaho 

|-
! 
| Thomas L. Glenn
|  | Populist
| 1900
|  | Incumbent retired.New member elected.Republican gain.
| nowrap | 

|}

Illinois

Indiana

Iowa

Kansas

Kentucky

Louisiana

Maine

Maryland 

|-
! 
| William H. Jackson
|  | Republican
| 1900
| Incumbent re-elected.
| nowrap | 
|-
! 
| Albert Blakeney
|  | Republican
| 1900
|  | Incumbent retired.New member elected. Democratic gain.
| nowrap | 
|-
! 
| Frank C. Wachter
|  | Republican
| 1898
| Incumbent re-elected.
| nowrap | 

|-
! 
| Charles R. Schirm
|  | Republican
| 1900
|  | Incumbent lost re-election. New member elected. Democratic gain.
| nowrap | 

|-
! 
| Sydney Emanuel Mudd I
|  | Republican
| 1896
| Incumbent re-elected.
| nowrap | 

|-
! 
| George A. Pearre
|  | Republican
| 1898
| Incumbent re-elected
| nowrap | 
|}

Massachusetts 

|-
! 
| George P. Lawrence
|  | Republican
| 1897 (special)
| Incumbent re-elected.
| nowrap | 

|-
! 
| Frederick H. Gillett
|  | Republican
| 1892
| Incumbent re-elected.
| nowrap | 

|-
! 
| John R. Thayer
|  | Democratic
| 1898
| Incumbent re-elected.
| nowrap | 

|-
! 
| Charles Q. Tirrell
|  | Republican
| 1900
| Incumbent re-elected.
| nowrap | 

|-
! 
| William S. Knox
|  | Republican
| 1894
|  | Incumbent retired.New member elected.Republican hold.
| nowrap | 

|-
! 
| colspan="3" |Vacant
|  | Incumbent resigned May 1, 1902 to become United States Secretary of the Navy.New member elected.Republican hold.
| nowrap | 

|-
! 
| Ernest W. Roberts
|  | Republican
| 1898
| Incumbent re-elected.
| nowrap | 

|-
! 
| Samuel W. McCall
|  | Republican
| 1892
| Incumbent re-elected.
| nowrap | 

|-
! 
| Joseph A. Conry
|  | Democratic
| 1900
|  | Incumbent lost re-election.New member elected.Citizens Democratic gain.
| nowrap | 

|-
! 
| Henry F. Naphen
|  | Democratic
| 1898
|  | Incumbent retired.New member elected.Democratic hold.
| nowrap | 

|-
! 
| colspan="3" | None (new seat)
|  | New seat.New member elected.Democratic gain.
| nowrap |  
|-
! 
| Samuel L. Powers
|  | Republican
| 1900
| Incumbent re-elected.
| nowrap |

|-
! 
| William S. Greene
|  | Republican
| 1898 (special)
| Incumbent re-elected.
| nowrap | 

|-
! 
| William C. Lovering
|  | Republican
| 1896
| Incumbent re-elected.
| nowrap | 

|}

Michigan

Minnesota

Mississippi 

|-
! 
| Ezekiel S. Candler Jr.
|  | Democratic
| 1900
| Incumbent re-elected.
| nowrap | 

|-
! 
| Thomas Spight
|  | Democratic
| 1898 (special)
| Incumbent re-elected.
| nowrap | 

|-
! 
| Pat Henry
|  | Democratic
| 1900
|  | Incumbent lost renomination.New member elected.Democratic hold.
| nowrap | 

|-
! 
| Andrew F. Fox
|  | Democratic
| 1896
|  | Incumbent retired.New member elected.Democratic hold.
| nowrap | 

|-
! 
| John S. Williams
|  | Democratic
| 1892
|  | Incumbent redistricted to the .New member elected.Democratic hold.
| nowrap | 

|-
! 
| Frank A. McLain
|  | Democratic
| 1898 (special)
|  | Incumbent redistricted to the .New member elected.Democratic hold.
| nowrap | 

|-
! rowspan=2 | 
| Charles E. Hooker
|  | Democratic
| 1900
|  | Incumbent retired.New member elected.Democratic hold.
| rowspan=2 nowrap | 
|-
| Frank A. McLain
|  | Democratic
| 1898 (special)

|-
! 
| John S. Williams
|  | Democratic
| 1892
|  | Incumbent redistricted from the .Incumbent re-elected.Democratic gain.
| nowrap | 

|}

Missouri

Montana 

|-
! 
| Caldwell Edwards
|  | Populist
| 1900
|  |Incumbent retired.New member elected.Republican gain.
| nowrap | 

|}

Nebraska 

|-
! 
| Elmer Burkett
|  | Republican
| 1898
| Incumbent re-elected.
| nowrap | 

|-
! 
| David H. Mercer
|  | Republican
| 1892
|  | Incumbent lost re-election.New member elected.Democratic gain.
| nowrap | 

|-
! 
| John S. Robinson
|  | Democratic
| 1898
| rowspan=3  | Incumbent lost re-election.New member elected.Republican gain.
| nowrap | 

|-
! 
| William L. Stark
|  | Populist
| 1896
| nowrap | 

|-
! 
| Ashton C. Shallenberger
|  | Democratic
| 1900
| nowrap | 

|-
! 
| William Neville
|  | Populist
| 1899 (special)
|  | Incumbent retired.New member elected.Republican gain.
| nowrap | 

|}

Nevada

New Hampshire

New Jersey

New Mexico Territory 
See Non-voting delegates, below.

New York

North Carolina

North Dakota 

|-
! rowspan=2 | 
| Thomas F. Marshall
|  | Republican
| nowrap | 1900
| Incumbent re-elected.
| nowrap rowspan=2 | 

|-
| colspan=3 | New seat
|  | New member elected.Republican gain.

|}

Ohio

Oklahoma Territory 
See Non-voting delegates, below.

Oregon 

|-
! 
| Thomas H. Tongue
|  | Republican
| 1896
| Incumbent re-elected.Died before next term began.
| nowrap | 
|-
! 
| Malcolm A. Moody
|  | Republican
| 1898
|  | Incumbent lost renomination.New member elected.Republican hold.
| nowrap | 
|}

Pennsylvania

Rhode Island

South Carolina

|-
! 
| William Elliott
|  | Democratic
| 18861896
|  | Incumbent retired to run for U.S. senator.New member elected.Democratic hold.
| nowrap | 

|-
! 
| W. Jasper Talbert
|  | Democratic
| 1892
|  | Incumbent retired to run for Governor of South Carolina.New member elected.Democratic hold.
| nowrap | 

|-
! 
| Asbury Latimer
|  | Democratic
| 1892
|  | Incumbent retired to run for U.S. senator.New member elected.Democratic hold.
| nowrap | 

|-
! 
| Joseph T. Johnson
|  | Democratic
| 1900
| Incumbent re-elected.
| nowrap | 

|-
! 
| David E. Finley
|  | Democratic
| 1898
| Incumbent re-elected.
| nowrap | 

|-
! 
| Robert B. Scarborough
|  | Democratic
| 1900
| Incumbent re-elected.
| nowrap | 

|-
! 
| Asbury F. Lever
|  | Democratic
| 1901 
| Incumbent re-elected.
| nowrap | 

|}

South Dakota 

|-
! rowspan=2 | 
| Charles H. Burke
|  | Republican
| 1898
| Incumbent re-elected.
| rowspan=2 nowrap | 

|-
| Eben Martin
|  | Republican
| 1900
| Incumbent re-elected.

|}

Tennessee 

|-
! 
| Walter P. Brownlow
|  | Republican
| 1896
| Incumbent re-elected.
| nowrap | 

|-
! 
| Henry R. Gibson
|  | Republican
| 1894
| Incumbent re-elected.
| nowrap | 

|-
! 
| John A. Moon
|  | Democratic
| 1896
| Incumbent re-elected.
| nowrap | 

|-
! 
| Charles E. Snodgrass
|  | Democratic
| 1898
|  |Incumbent lost renomination.New member elected.Democratic hold.
|  nowrap | 

|-
! 
| James D. Richardson
|  | Democratic
| 1884
| Incumbent re-elected.
| nowrap | 

|-
! 
| John W. Gaines
|  | Democratic
| 1896
| Incumbent re-elected.
| nowrap | 

|-
! 
| Lemuel P. Padgett
|  | Democratic
| 1900
| Incumbent re-elected.
| nowrap | 

|-
! 
| Thetus W. Sims
|  | Democratic
| 1896
| Incumbent re-elected.
| nowrap | 

|-
! 
| Rice A. Pierce
|  | Democratic
| 1896
| Incumbent re-elected.
| nowrap | 

|-
! 
| Malcolm R. Patterson
|  | Democratic
| 1900
| Incumbent re-elected.
| 

|}

Texas

Utah

Vermont

Virginia

Washington 

|-
! rowspan=3 | 
| style=height:5em |Wesley Livsey Jones
|  | Republican
| 1898
| Incumbent re-elected.
| nowrap rowspan=3 | 

|-
| style=height:5em | Francis W. Cushman
|  | Republican
| 1898
| Incumbent re-elected.
|-
|colspan=3|None (new seat)
|  | New seat.New member elected.Republican gain.
|}

West Virginia 

|-
! 
| Blackburn B. Dovener
|  | Republican
| 1894
| Incumbent re-elected.
| nowrap | 

|-
! 
| Alston G. Dayton
|  | Republican
| 1894
| Incumbent re-elected.
| nowrap | 

|-
! 
| Joseph H. Gaines
|  | Republican
| 1900
| Incumbent re-elected.
| nowrap | 

|-
! 
| colspan=3 | None (incumbent redistricted)
|  | Incumbent redistricted to the .New member elected.Republican hold.
| nowrap | 

|-
! 
| James A. Hughes
|  | Republican
| 1900
|  | New member elected.Republican gain.
| nowrap | 

|}

Wisconsin

Wyoming 

|-
! 
| Frank W. Mondell
|  | Republican
| 1898
| Incumbent re-elected.
| nowrap | 

|}

Non-voting delegates 

|-
! 
| Marcus A. Smith
|  |  Democratic
| 1900
|  | Incumbent retired.New delegate elected.Democratic hold.
| nowrap | 
|-
! 
| Robert Wilcox
| bgcolor= | Home Rule
| 1900
|  | Incumbent lost re-election.New member elected.Republican gain.
|
|-
! 

|-
! 
| Dennis T. Flynn
|  | Republican
| 18921894 1898
|  | Incumbent retired.New delegate elected.Republican hold.
| nowrap | 

|}

See also
 1902 United States elections
 1902–03 United States Senate elections
 57th United States Congress
 58th United States Congress

Notes

References

Bibliography
 Republican Congressional Committee, The Republican Campaign Textbook 1902 (1902).

External links
 Office of the Historian (Office of Art & Archives, Office of the Clerk, U.S. House of Representatives)